Early Cats and Tracks Volume 2 is Psapp's sixth EP, released exclusively on iTunes on April 6, 2009.  Like the first Early Cats and Tracks, it is distributed exclusively as a digital release and contains previously released material.

Track listing

Personnel

Carim Clasmann
Galia Durant

Notes

"Feel the Fur" was originally released on Buttons and War.
"Dad's Breakdown" and "Northdown C" were originally released on Do Something Wrong.
"Happy Lamb" was originally released on Northdown.
"Whores" was originally released on Rear Moth.
"Dad's Breakdown" features spoken word vocals performed by Durant's father.

External links
Psapp official website 
Psapp at Domino Records

2009 EPs
Psapp albums
Domino Recording Company EPs